Blaiklock is a surname. Notable people by that name include:

 Edward Musgrave Blaiklock (1903–1983), chair of classics at the University of Auckland.
 Michael Blaiklock, American actor and writer.
 Ken Blaiklock (1927-2020), a British Antarctic surveyor.
 Henry Musgrave Blaiklock (1790–1843), English architect and civil engineer.